Federal Route 68, also known as Jalan Gombak or Jalan Karak Lama, is a federal road in Malaysia that links the city of Kuala Lumpur to Bentong, Pahang. Before Kuala Lumpur–Karak Expressway E8/FT2 was built, the road was used to be a part of Kuala Lumpur–Kuantan Road FT2; however, due to its sharp corners, narrow roadway and lack of safety features, a replacement highway known as the Kuala Lumpur–Karak Highway FT2 (now Kuala Lumpur–Karak Expressway E8/FT2) was built, causing the former Kuala Lumpur–Bentong section to be re-gazetted as the Federal Route 68.

Route background
Jalan Gombak begins at Setapak Interchange, where it intersects with Jalan Pahang FT2 and Jalan Genting Klang. Jalan Gombak still holds the FT2 designation until Kampung Bandar Dalam Intersection, where the FT2 route is detoured to Jalan Kampung Bandar Dalam FT2 while Jalan Gombak route number changes to FT68.

The section from its beginning at Setapak Interchange to Mile 8 Intersection is a dual-carriageway with the speed limit of 60 km/h. After Mile 8 Intersection, the FT68 becomes a single-carriageway road but retains the 60 km/h speed limit due to its narrower condition. After Kampung Sungai Rumput, the Jalan Gombak FT68 becomes more winding, causing the speed limit to be reduced to 50 km/h. At that point, Jalan Gombak FT68 begins ascending the Titiwangsa Range until the Selangor–Pahang state border where it joins Genting Sempah–Genting Highlands Highway and overlaps it until the Genting Sempah Roundabout that links the FT68 road with the Kuala Lumpur–Karak Expressway E8/FT2.

From Genting Sempah, Jalan Gombak FT68 descends the Titiwangsa Range, passing the town of Bukit Tinggi along the way. 7 km before the road ends, the FT68 was linked to the Kuala Lumpur–Karak Expressway E8/FT2 for the last time via a short 400-m spur road. Jalan Gombak FT68 ends at Ketari Intersection near Bentong, where it is linked to the Federal Route 8.

History

Jalan Gombak FT68 used to be a part of the Kuala Lumpur–Kuantan Road FT2. It was constructed in 1915. However, the road's very sharp corners, deep ravines, narrow roadway and lack of safety features made it dangerous. Therefore, in the 1970s, a replacement segment for the narrow and winding Jalan Gombak from Kuala Lumpur to Karak was constructed. The replacement section was known as the Kuala Lumpur–Karak Highway FT2, featuring the 914.4-m Genting Sempah Tunnel. The 75.2-km toll highway was constructed at the cost of RM136.4 million and was opened to traffic on 7 January 1978. As a result, the old Jalan Gombak was re-gazetted as the Federal Route 68.

The Kuala Lumpur–Karak Highway FT2 was then upgraded to a full controlled-access expressway in 1994 and was completed four years later. However, unlike the Kuala Lumpur–Seremban Expressway E37/E2 project where the old Federal Route 1 section from Kuala Lumpur to Seremban was rehabilitated as part of the project, no such rehabilitation was done towards Jalan Gombak FT68 during the Kuala Lumpur–Karak Expressway E8/FT2 upgrading project. As a result, very few road users are willing to use the FT68 road due to its dangerous nature, even when the Kuala Lumpur–Karak Expressway E8/FT2 becomes badly congested during festive seasons.

The section of Jalan Gombak FT68 from Taman Ibu Kota intersection to Mile 8 Gombak intersection and Jalan Sungai Pusu B38 up to the entrance of the International Islamic University Malaysia (IIUM) Gombak were upgraded to a dual-carriageway as an Eighth Malaysia Plan (RMK-8) project to provide better access to the university from Kuala Lumpur. The upgrading works began on 1 November 2001 and were completed on 18 August 2005.

List of junctions

References

Malaysian Federal Roads